Sphaerocardamum is a genus of flowering plants belonging to the family Brassicaceae.

Its native range is Northeastern Mexico.

Species:

Sphaerocardamum compressum 
Sphaerocardamum divaricatum 
Sphaerocardamum macrum 
Sphaerocardamum nesliiforme 
Sphaerocardamum stellatum

References

Brassicaceae
Brassicaceae genera